Eternal Endless Infinity is the first album by Austrian symphonic power metal band Visions of Atlantis, released in 2002. A new edition was released 29 November 2004 and contains three bonus tracks from the band's demo Morning in Atlantis.

Track listing 
All lyrics by Chris Kamper. All music by Visions of Atlantis.

Personnel 
Band members
Nicole Bogner – vocals
Christian Stani – vocals
Werner Fiedler – guitars
Chris Kamper – synthesizer
Mike Koren – bass guitars
Thomas Caser – drums

Production
Jörg Rainer Friede – producer, engineer, mixing
Thomas Caser – booklet design
Torsten Wördemann – engineer

Booklet inconsistency 
The booklet of the original 2002 release by GOI Music contains the original band pictures made for the album and has Christian Stani mentioned and pictured correctly as the male vocalist. The 2004 Napalm Records rerelease contains band pictures which match with the band pictures used for the booklet of the second album 'Cast Away', which was released in 2003. This booklet incorrectly mentions and pictures Visions of Atlantis' second vocalist Mario Plank as the album's vocalist, which could not be possible since the songs of both editions sound the same and Mario Plank just joined the band after Christian Stani's departure in 2003.

References 

2002 debut albums
Visions of Atlantis albums
Napalm Records albums